ECX may refer to:

 European Climate Exchange
 Ethiopia Commodity Exchange
 Embedded Compact Extended, a small form factor Single Board Computer specification
 ECX register, an x86 general purpose register that is used by the CPU to store the loop counter
 ECX screwdriver